Richard Leslie Hills  MBE (1 September 1936 – 10 May 2019) was an English historian and clergyman who wrote extensively on the history of technology, particularly steam power. He helped to found Manchester's Science and Industry Museum, where he was its first lecturer-in-charge.

Early life and education

Mills was born on 1 September 1936 at Lee Green, the second son of Leslie Hills and Margaret 'Peggy' Magdalen Miller (the youngest daughter of John Ontario Miller). His father Leslie Hills was an Anglican vicar; his mother died of cancer when he was two, and Hills spent his childhood in the care of an aunt in Tunbridge Wells, Kent.

From an early age, he was fascinated with mechanical toys, whether making model aircraft on the nursery window sill, arranging layouts for model trains or taking clocks to pieces. At school - he attended Charterhouse School in Godalming, Surrey - he started making a 3½ inch gauge live steam model of the 1830 Invicta or Canterbury Lamb. 

In National Service, he obtained a commission as 2nd Lieutenant in the Royal Artillery, ending up with the 26 Field Regiment at Folkestone during the Suez Crisis. He was sent to Lydd-on-Sea to supervise the accommodation for Territorial units practising shooting on the Dungeness ranges. His mechanical interests at this time included a two-stroke Excelsior motor bike and a restoration of a Standard car.

He then studied the History Tripos at Queens' College, Cambridge. While at Cambridge, he acquired a 1924 Lancia Lambda in need of restoration, and was introduced to Mr. and Mrs. Kenny who allowed impecunious students to use workshop facilities near Long Melford while they were trying to preserve the Stretham Old Engine that once drained the Waterbeach Level. Hills researched the history of this engine and the Fens, and, after completing a Dip. Ed. at Cambridge and a brief teaching spell (at Earmley School, Sussex and Worcester College for the Blind), did a year's research into fen drainage at Imperial College, London for which he was awarded a diploma while also publishing his first book, Machines, Mills and Uncountable Costly Necessities.

Through the support of Professor Rupert Hall at Imperial, Donald Cardwell offered Hills a post as research assistant in his History of Science Department at the UMIST to study the history of textile technology; from 1965 to 1968, he studied a PhD at UMIST, living for a time near Hyde, Cheshire.

Career

Science and Industry Museum
While in Manchester, Hills helped to launch a science museum for Manchester, supported by the City of Manchester, the University of Manchester and UMIST. In 1967, UMIST purchased 97 Grosvenor Street for demolition but agreed to allow part of it to be used temporarily to start the museum. In 1968, the three authorities agreed £12,670 p.a. to fund a lecturer in charge, two technicians, a secretary and other running costs. Because he had been collecting exhibits such as the archives of locomotive producer Beyer, Peacock and Company and many more, Hills was offered the post of lecturer in charge. The first stage of the museum was opened on 20 October 1969 by Lord Rhodes, Lord Lieutenant of Lancashire. It contained displays of steam and internal combustion engines, paper-making, printing, spinning and weaving, scientific instruments, clocks, electrical exhibits such as wireless sets, archives and much more.

The museum's chief technician was Frank Wightman, an experienced millwright, with a passion for the steam engines that drove the textile mills. Manchester had been a centre for mechanical engineering with many internationally famous firms. Hills realised that it would be possible to find small examples of machine tools like lathes or planing machines to show the basic principles. Also many textile machines might be shortened to just a few spindles, making them easier to demonstrate. So he decided to concentrate on mill engines of medium size that would still be impressive. These could be demonstrated under steam from a modern package boiler.

Hills decided the museum would also collect exhibits they could not display immediately but would be necessary in a permanent museum. Offered a steam beam engine of around 1830 (like those that would have driven the first cotton spinning mills), he decided to use Wightman's expertise and dismantle it for storage. Likewise he accepted an offer of one of the last steam mill engines ever built, the 1925 Galloway engine from Elm Street Mill, Burnley. This required all of Wightman's skills to remove it, and it was held in three different stores before being re-erected in 1983. In 1972, the museum was able to expand into the whole of 97 Grosvenor Street so as many as possible of the exhibits were put into working order and demonstrated especially on Working Saturdays which attracted many visitors. Between the opening in 1969 and closure of Grosvenor Street in 1983, over half a million visitors passed through its doors.

The celebration of the 150th anniversary of the 1830 opening of the Liverpool & Manchester Railway saw the acquisition of the original terminus at Liverpool Road, Manchester, by Greater Manchester County Council, and the decision to move the museum into that historic site. This made it possible to take the mill engines out of store. Frank Wightman had died, leaving Hills as the only person who had seen them in their original situations. He had to supervise the construction of foundations then the actual erection of the mass of separate parts (total weight around 400 tons). For these engines to run again, there had to be installed services such as steam, water, condensing apparatus, drains as well as overhead cranes. It is probably the most complex display attempted for a museum. The Power Hall has been a major draw for visitors ever since, still being the most popular part of the museum.

At Liverpool Road, the museum expanded into railway-related exhibits. Hills saw that they could complement the National Railway Museum by displaying locomotives that had been exported overseas by the many local locomotive building firms. A cousin, Elspeth Quayle, who was a member of the Manx House of Keys, introduced him to their Minister of Transport and so was arranged the return to Manchester of the Beyer, Peacock-built Pender. The sectioning of this locomotive proved to be another big draw. The British Overseas Railways Historical Society helped with the return of a Vulcan Foundry 4-4-0 locomotive from Pakistan. Netherlands State Railways presented the high-speed electric EM2 Class Ariadne built at Gorton with Metropolitan-Vickers electrics (designed originally to work between Manchester and Sheffield and then on to London when that part of the line might be electrified). Perhaps Hills' greatest achievement was securing and organising the return of a Beyer, Peacock 'GL' Class Garratt articulated locomotive from South Africa. The logistics of moving this 120 ton monster from Johannesburg to Manchester were considerable, involving a visit by him to that country.

The museum has continued to expand and develop, becoming one of north West England's most popular visitor attraction. Since the opening at Liverpool Road in 1983, there have been around 2.5 million visitors; in 2013 alone there were 643,000 visitors, drawn by the many working exhibits, the tradition started at Grosvenor Street.

Church work
By 1983, Hills was feeling the stress of many years overworking. So he took early retirement on ill-health grounds and trained to serve in the Church of England as an ordained priest. He studied at St Deiniol's Library (now known as Gladstone's Library), Hawarden, Flintshire from 1985 to 1987; and he continued to help in local churches in the Mottram deanery.

He continued, however, to contribute more books and articles on the history of technology, including a three volume biography of James Watt. Hills was also Honorary Reader in History of Science and Technology at UMIST.

Publications 

Hills wrote over 100 articles  in journals such as Newcomen Society Transactions, Manchester Memoirs, The Railway Magazine, Railway World, Notes and Records of the Royal Society, Journal of the Textile Institute, Industrial Archaeology, The Quarterly (Journal of the British Association of Paper Historians), International Association of Paper Historians Year Book, Technology and Culture, History of Technology, Museum Association Journal, Snowdon Ranger (Welsh Highland Railway Society), Textile History and the Proceedings of the Society of Antiquaries of Scotland.

He has made contributions to the following and other encyclopaedias, etc. Biographical Dictionary of Scientists, Biographical Dictionary of the History of Technology, Encyclopedia of the History of Technology, New Dictionary of the National Biography, Oxford Companion to the Book and Reader's Guide to the History of Science.

Offices, awards and honours 
Hills held various positions in learned societies at various times:
 Manchester Literary and Philosophical Society – Member of Council, later (2014) an Honorary Member
 Manchester Region Industrial Archeology Society – Chairman, Secretary, later an Honorary Member
 International Association of Paper Historians – President, later an Honorary Member
 British Association of Paper Historians – Founding President
 Newcomen Society for the History of Engineering – Member of Council, Chairman of the North West Branch
 Manchester Association of Engineers – Member of Council, Editor, President
 Society of Ordained Scientists – Secretary

Awards and honours included:
 Award of Merit, Cambridge Education Diploma
 Abbot Payson Usher Prize, 1973 (R. L. Mills and A. J. Pacey, "The Measurement of Power in the Early Steam-driven Textile Mills," Technology and Culture 13 (1972): 25–43)
 Companion of the Institution of Mechanical Engineers
 Honorary Life Vice-President, Museum of Science and Industry, Manchester
 Awarded Manchester University Medal of Honour (2014)

Hills was appointed Member of the Order of the British Empire (MBE) in the 2015 New Year Honours for services to industrial heritage.

Family
While working as curate at St Michael and All Angels Church, Mottram in Longdendale, Hills met Bernice Pickford and they were married there in August 2008. She died from cancer in 2016. After her death, as therapy, he was encouraged to write his autobiography, The Seven ages of One Man (published in 2018).

He was diagnosed with Parkinson's disease in 2011 and died on 10 May 2019, aged 82.

References

Historians of technology
1936 births
2019 deaths
Alumni of Queens' College, Cambridge
Alumni of Imperial College London
20th-century English Anglican priests
Members of the Order of the British Empire